The World War II Soviet submarine L-21 belonged to the L-class or Leninets class of minelayer submarines. She was part of the last series (Group 4) of her class, having some improvements including more torpedo tubes. The commander during the war was Sergey S. Mogilevskiy.

Service history 
Before completion, L-21 was sunk by German aircraft in Leningrad on 24 May 1942. L-21 was later raised, completed and commissioned, making both torpedo attacks and mine-laying. Among her victims was the Hansa, a neutral Swedish passenger ship travering from Nynäshamn to Visby. L-21 also managed to sink a number of German warships, including two torpedo boats and a submarine.

One of her mines heavily damaged the German destroyer Z43.

References 

1940 ships
Ships built in the Soviet Union
Leninets-class submarines
Submarines sunk by aircraft
World War II submarines of the Soviet Union
Maritime incidents in May 1942
Ships sunk by German aircraft